WAYJ (89.5 FM) is a radio station broadcasting a Christian radio format. Licensed to Naples, Florida, United States, the station is currently owned and operated by WAY-FM Network.

History

The station went on the air as WBPT on February 1, 1988, as "Power 89.5 The Spark". It was a simulcast of WSRX (now WJYO) 91.5 "The Spark", which was playing Hiphop, Freestyle, and Dance music at the time. Some of their Saturday night broadcasts included live performers like DJ Magic Mike, Johnny O., Sexy C, and many other South Florida local artists.

On June 16, 1992, the station changed its call sign to WSRX, broadcasting as The Spark, with Arnie Coones. Later, Jim Channell, Donna Jones, Bob Edgar and Connie McNair were the hosts sharing Jesus across S.W. Florida as Praise FM, 89.5. The station was moved to the Shadowlawn Assembly of God Church, and there Shelre' joined the group and open the airways to Adult Contemporary Christian music 24 hours a day.  Later, the station went to 100,000 watts.

On February 14, 2012, it was announced that WAY-FM was in the process of acquiring WSRX from the Family Church; this move was designed to continue WAY-FM programming in its legacy Southwest Florida market, following plans by Classical South Florida to acquire its now-former station, WAYJ 88.7. On March 1, 2012, WSRX's programming was discontinued, in favor of simulcasting WAYJ in the interim. On June 7, 2012, the sale of WAYJ to Classical South Florida was completed, becoming a classical music station WNPS, with WAY-FM programming exclusively heard on WSRX. On June 18, 2012, the station changed its call sign to the current WAYJ.

Translators
WOLZ 95.3 FM repeats WAYJ on its HD Radio subchannel.

References

External links
WAYJ official site
 Family Church of Marco Island (former owners of Praise FM)

Radio stations established in 1988
Contemporary Christian radio stations in the United States
WAY-FM Network
1988 establishments in Florida
AYJ